Teodor Zaczyk (20 April 1900 – 23 April 1990) was a Polish fencer. He competed at the 1936 and 1948 Summer Olympics.

References

1900 births
1990 deaths
Polish male fencers
Olympic fencers of Poland
Fencers at the 1936 Summer Olympics
Fencers at the 1948 Summer Olympics
People from Siemiatycze County
Sportspeople from Podlaskie Voivodeship
20th-century Polish people